Taste receptor type 2 member 13 is a protein that in humans is encoded by the TAS2R13 gene.

Function 

This gene product belongs to the family of candidate taste receptors that are members of the G-protein-coupled receptor superfamily. These proteins are specifically expressed in the taste receptor cells of the tongue and palate epithelia. They are organized in the genome in clusters and are genetically linked to loci that influence bitter perception in mice and humans. In functional expression studies, they respond to bitter tastants. This gene maps to the taste receptor gene cluster on chromosome 12p13.

See also
 Taste receptor

References

Further reading

Human taste receptors